was the Governor of Hiroshima Prefecture from 1962 to 1973. In 1974 was elected as a member of the upper house of the Japanese parliament.

References

1918 births
1981 deaths
People from Hiroshima
University of Tokyo alumni
Japanese prosecutors
Governors of Hiroshima
Members of the House of Councillors (Japan)
20th-century Japanese lawyers